Julio Boltvinik Kalinka (born 10 March 1944) is a Mexican academic and politician who served as PRI and PRD member of the Chamber of Deputies in the LIX Legislature of the Mexican Congress from September 2003 to August 2006. He was educated at the National Autonomous University of Mexico, El Colegio de México (Economics) and the University of East Anglia (MA, Development Economics). He completed his Ph.D. at the Centro de Investigación y Estudios Superiores de Antropología Social in Guadalajara. He has been Professor at El Colegio de México since 1992.

References

1944 births
Living people
National Autonomous University of Mexico alumni
El Colegio de México alumni
Alumni of the University of East Anglia
Members of the Chamber of Deputies (Mexico)
Academic staff of El Colegio de México
Party of the Democratic Revolution politicians
Politicians from Puebla
People from Puebla (city)
21st-century Mexican politicians